Michael Bernard Mukasey (born July 28, 1941) is an American attorney and former federal judge who served as the 81st Attorney General of the United States from 2007 to 2009.

Born in New York City in 1941, Mukasey attended Ramaz School, graduated from Columbia College with a degree in history and received a Bachelor of Laws from Yale Law School. He worked in private practice for two decades and spent four years as an Assistant United States Attorney in the office of the United States Attorney for the Southern District of New York. In 1987, President Ronald Reagan nominated Mukasey to serve as a District Judge on the United States District Court for the Southern District of New York. He took the bench in 1988, became the Chief Judge in 2000 and served until his retirement in 2006.

Mukasey was nominated to be Attorney General by President George W. Bush following the resignation of Alberto Gonzales. Mukasey was the second Jewish U.S. Attorney General. Mukasey left office after Bush's term as President ended. He is currently of counsel at the international law firm Debevoise & Plimpton. Mukasey, pursuant to the Foreign Agents Registration Act (FARA), is registered as working on behalf of the National Council of Resistance of Iran.

Early life and education
Mukasey was born in 1941 in New York City. His father was born near Baranavichy in Belarus (then in the Russian Empire) and emigrated to the U.S. in 1921.

Mukasey graduated in 1959 from the Ramaz School, an independent (formerly boys' and now co-educational) Modern Orthodox Jewish prep school in the Upper East Side neighborhood of Manhattan in New York City. His wife, Susan, was later a teacher and headmistress of the lower school at Ramaz, and both of their children (Marc and Jessica) attended the school.

As an undergraduate student, Mukasey was the editorials editor of the Columbia Daily Spectator at Columbia University, where he received his Bachelor of Arts degree in 1963, majoring in history. He received his Bachelor of Laws from Yale Law School in 1967. He was a friend of fellow student Sanford Greenberg.

Early career
Mukasey practiced law for 20 years in New York City, serving for four years as an Assistant U.S. Attorney in the U.S. Attorney's Office for the Southern District of New York in which he worked with Rudolph Giuliani. From 1967 to 1972, he was an associate with the law firm of Webster Sheffield Fleischmann Hitchcock & Brookfield, later known as Webster & Sheffield. In 1976, he joined the New York law firm of Patterson Belknap Webb & Tyler, to which he returned after retirement from the U.S. District Court. Mukasey began teaching at Columbia Law School in the spring of 1993 and has taught there every spring semester since.

Mukasey's son, Marc L. Mukasey, is a founding partner of Mukasey Frenchman LLP, a small law firm in New York City. The Mukaseys have a professional relationship with Rudy Giuliani; Mukasey and son were also justice advisers to Rudy Giuliani's presidential campaign. Mukasey administered the oath of office to Mayor-elect Giuliani in 1994 and 1998.

Judicial career
On July 27, 1987, Mukasey was nominated to be a United States District Judge of the United States District Court for the Southern District of New York in Manhattan by President Ronald Reagan, to a seat vacated by Abraham David Sofaer. Mukasey was confirmed by the United States Senate on November 6, 1987, and received his commission on November 9, 1987; he took the bench in 1988. He served in that position for 18 years, including tenure as Chief Judge from March 2000 through July 2006.

During his service on the bench, Mukasey presided over the criminal prosecution of Omar Abdel Rahman and El Sayyid Nosair, whom he sentenced to life in prison for a plot to blow up the United Nations and other Manhattan landmarks uncovered during an investigation into the 1993 World Trade Center bombing. During that case, Mukasey spoke out against leaks by law enforcement officials regarding the facts of the case allegedly aimed at prejudicing potential jurors against the defendants. During that case, Mukasey also refused to recuse himself, warning that the demand for his recusal would "disqualify not only an obscure district judge such as the author of this opinion, but also Justices Brandeis and Frankfurter ... each having been both a Jew and a Zionist."

Mukasey also presided over the trial of Jose Padilla, ruling that the U.S. citizen and alleged terrorist could be held as an enemy combatant but was entitled to see his lawyers. Mukasey also was the judge in the litigation between developer Larry Silverstein and several insurance companies arising from the destruction of the World Trade Center. In a 2003 suit, he issued a preliminary injunction preventing the Motion Picture Association of America from enforcing its ban against the distribution of screener copies of films during awards season, ruling that the ban was likely an unlawful restraint of trade unfair to independent filmmakers.

In June 2003, Democratic New York Senator Charles Schumer submitted Mukasey's name, along with four other Republicans or Republican appointees, as a suggestion for Bush to consider for nomination to the Supreme Court.

On October 14, 2004, citing U.S. Supreme Court precedent, Mukasey reversed his September 2002 decision and dismissed a case in which plaintiffs in twenty consolidated actions sued the Italian insurance company Generali S.p.A. (Generali), seeking damages for nonpayment of insurance proceeds to beneficiaries of policies purchased by Holocaust victims before the end of World War II. In so ruling, Mukasey gave deference to "a federal executive branch policy favoring voluntary resolution of Holocaust-era insurance claims."

Retirement
Although Article III of the U.S. Constitution entitles district court judges to hold their judicial appointments for life, in June 2006 Mukasey announced that he would retire as a judge and return to private practice at the end of the summer. On August 1, 2006, he was succeeded as Chief Judge of the Southern District by Judge Kimba Wood, entering senior status on the same day. Mukasey's retirement took effect on September 9, 2006. On September 12, 2006, Patterson Belknap Webb & Tyler announced that Mukasey had rejoined the firm as a partner.

On the March 18, 2007, episode of Meet the Press, Sen. Schumer suggested Mukasey as a potential Attorney General nominee who, "by [his] reputation and career, shows that [he] put rule of law first."

After retiring from the bench, Mukasey made campaign contributions to Giuliani for president and Joe Lieberman for Senate. Mukasey was also listed on the Giuliani campaign's Justice Advisory Committee.

He is the recipient of several awards, most notably the Learned Hand Medal of the Federal Bar Council.

Extrajudicial opinions on law and terrorism
In May 2004, while still a member of the judiciary, Judge Mukasey delivered a speech (which he converted into a The Wall Street Journal opinion piece) that defended the USA PATRIOT Act; the piece also expressed doubt that the FBI engaged in racial profiling of Arabs and criticized the American Library Association for condemning the Patriot Act but not taking a position on librarians imprisoned in Cuba.

On August 22, 2007, The Wall Street Journal published another op-ed by Mukasey, prompted by the resolution of the Padilla prosecution, in which he argued that "current institutions and statutes are not well suited to even the limited task of supplementing . . . a military effort to combat Islamic terrorism." Mukasey instead advocated for Congress, which "has the constitutional authority to establish additional inferior courts," to "turn [its] considerable talents to deliberating how to fix a strained and mismatched legal system."

U.S. Attorney General
On September 17, 2007, Mukasey was nominated by President Bush to replace Alberto Gonzales as the Attorney General. At his nomination press conference with the President, Mukasey stated, "The task of helping to protect our security, which the Justice Department shares with the rest of our government, is not the only task before us. The Justice Department must also protect the safety of our children, the commerce that assures our prosperity, and the rights and liberties that define us as a nation."

Because Mukasey would likely serve only until the end of President Bush's term of office in January 2009, the White House hoped Mukasey would be confirmed by the Senate by October 8, 2007. At first, a quick confirmation seemed likely. Senator Patrick Leahy, the Democratic Chairman of the Senate Judiciary Committee, was pleased that Mukasey was committed to a new administrative rule that would reduce the influence of the White House and other politicians on Justice Department investigations and personnel. This concession sought to avoid problems that arose during the controversy over the dismissal of U.S. Attorneys under the previous Attorney General's tenure.

However, during confirmation hearings, controversy arose over Mukasey's responses to questions about torture. Mukasey refused to state a clear legal position on the interrogation technique known as waterboarding (in which water is poured over a rag on the prisoner's face to simulate drowning). Leahy and the other nine Democratic committee members indicated to Mukasey, via letter, that they were "deeply troubled by your refusal to state unequivocally that waterboarding is illegal during your confirmation hearing..."

It appeared that Mukasey may have been concerned about the potential pursuit of government employees or agents, and their authorizing superiors, in American or foreign courts under criminal charges, when responding to the Senate Judiciary committee questions.
In describing the issue's challenges to the Bush administration, The New York Times quoted Scott L. Silliman, director of the Center on Law, Ethics and National Security at Duke University, as saying about such court cases, which could ultimately reach the president: "You would ask not just who carried it out, but who specifically approved it."

However, Robert M. Chesney, of Wake Forest University School of Law, and other national security specialists have pointed out that prosecution within the United States would be impeded by laws adopted since 2005 which permit safe-harbor protections to interrogators for governmentally authorized actions. It was believed that secret Justice Department legal opinions approved waterboarding and other procedures officially called "harsh interrogation techniques".

By November 1, 2007, five senators – Christopher Dodd of Connecticut, Joseph Biden of Delaware, John Kerry of Massachusetts, Edward Kennedy of Massachusetts and Bernie Sanders of Vermont – in addition to Leahy had announced their intention to vote against Mukasey's confirmation due to concerns about his stance on torture. Nevertheless, on November 6 the Senate Judiciary Committee endorsed the nomination of Mukasey, by an 11 to 8 vote, and sent his confirmation on to the full Senate.  Two days later, the Senate confirmed Mukasey by a 53–40 vote. The tight vote was the narrowest margin to confirm an attorney general in more than 50 years. Mukasey was sworn in at a private ceremony on November 9, 2007.

In 2009, legal ethics complaints were filed against Mukasey and other Bush administration attorneys for their roles in advocating torture.

Notable issues and comments

Relationship with Rudy Giuliani
Mukasey and Giuliani have been friends since working at the same law firm in the early 1970s. Mukasey pledged to recuse himself from cases involving Giuliani. Newspaper reports assumed that Mukasey would further recuse himself from cases involving Bernard Kerik, a former New York City police commissioner under Giuliani, who was under federal investigation for bribery and other offenses. However, neither presidential spokespersons nor Mukasey returned reporters' inquiries into whether Mukasey would recuse himself from the Kerik case.

During Giuliani's 2008 presidential campaign, Mukasey's stepson, Marc, was assigned by Giuliani's campaign to block Kerik's legal defense team from interviewing witnesses that might assist his defense in an attempt to protect Giuliani from the Kerik case.

During an Oval Office meeting with Rudy Giuliani in 2017, Mukasey pressed Secretary of State Rex Tillerson for the release of the indicted Turkish-Iranian gold trader, Reza Zarrab.

Crack cocaine stance
In 2007 the United States Sentencing Commission amended the Federal Sentencing Guidelines to lessen the disparity between the penalties for the possession and trafficking of powder cocaine and crack cocaine, citing racial disparity and the unfairness of the 100-1 crack-powder penalty threshold ratio. The Commission instead implemented an 18-1 ratio. Michael Mukasey, in the Attorney General's capacity, vehemently opposed and testified against this change, warning that thousands of violent criminals may be released under the guidelines and endanger the community. Mukasey's move was criticized by advocates of elimination of crack-powder disparity.

Remarks about 9/11 terrorist punishment
Speaking in London on March 14, 2008, Mukasey said that he hopes the detainees currently charged with participating in the September 11 attacks are not executed if found guilty in order to avoid creating any martyrs. Speaking in New York on March 5, 2012, Mukasey said his comments in 2008 were taken out of context. His "martyr" comment was a humorous reason offered as the only reason not to seek the death penalty. He then said if the detainees were found guilty, they should be executed in the due process of the law and not make an exception.

Remarks about alleged pre-9/11 terrorist phone call
Speaking in San Francisco to the California Commonwealth Club of California on March 27, 2008, Mukasey defended President Bush's program of wiretapping calls between Americans and suspected foreign terrorists without court authorization, and implied that the government might have been able to prevent the attacks of September 11, 2001, if it had been able to wiretap a specific call to the U.S. from Afghanistan. Before September 11, 2001, Mukasey said, "We knew that there had been a call from someplace that was known to be a safe house in Afghanistan, and we knew that it came to the United States. We didn't know precisely where it went." He paused, seemed to stifle tears or at least suppress emotion, then continued, "You've got 3,000 people who went to work that day, and didn't come home, to show for that."

Mukasey's comments were described by the Electronic Frontier Foundation as "a gross distortion of the facts and the law", as both Executive Order 12333 and the Foreign Intelligence Surveillance Act had offered a number of avenues for the United States government to intercept the phone call without a court order. Commentator Glenn Greenwald questioned Mukasey's honesty, as the alleged phone was unknown to the 9/11 Commission. In a subsequent letter to Mukasey, House Judiciary Committee Chairman John Conyers questioned whether any such phone call had ever actually occurred and, if so, why the government hadn't been able to use its then-existing legal authority and technological capabilities to monitor it.

Violations of the law are not always crimes
On August 12, 2008, Mukasey told American Bar Association annual meeting delegates that "not every wrong, or even every violation of the law, is a crime," with "only violations of the civil service laws" being found among hiring practices during Gonzales' tenure as Attorney General.  For example, a civil violation is not a crime.

Defense of torture
On December 11, 2014, Mukasey publicly stated on CNN that he believed waterboarding could not be called torture. In a 2008 hearing, he said waterboarding would feel like torture if he were subjected to it.
Asked directly if Michael Mukasey was a liar because he claimed that enhanced interrogation produced useful intelligence, Sen. John McCain stated unequivocally,  "Yes, I know that he is. Even if we had gotten useful information, the propaganda and the image and the behavior of the greatest nation on earth from torturing people is not what we want and it helps the enemy."

Defense of attorney-client privilege 
On April 18, 2018, Mukasey published an op-ed piece in the Wall Street Journal entitled "Trump, Cohen and Attorney-Client Privilege" attacking the use of a search warrant by the federal government to search Mr. Cohen's legal records, and attacking the track records of former FBI Directors / assistant US Attorneys General Robert Mueller and James Comey.

References

External links

 
 
 
 Questionnaire for Michael B. Mukasey, Attorney General Nominee
 Balancing Democracy, Justice, and Security November 2009 speech at the American University of Paris (with video)

1941 births
Living people
20th-century American judges
21st-century American politicians
American Orthodox Jews
American people of Belarusian-Jewish descent
Assistant United States Attorneys
Columbia University faculty
Dismissal of U.S. attorneys controversy
George W. Bush administration cabinet members
Jewish American members of the Cabinet of the United States
Judges of the United States District Court for the Southern District of New York
Lawyers from New York City
New York (state) Republicans
Patterson Belknap Webb & Tyler people
People associated with Debevoise & Plimpton
Politicians from the Bronx
Ramaz School alumni
United States Attorneys General
United States district court judges appointed by Ronald Reagan
Columbia College (New York) alumni
Yale Law School alumni